Wootton railway station is former railway station, and now a recreated heritage station, at Wootton on the Isle of Wight, off the south coast of England.

History
The original station, on the Newport-to-Ryde line, opened in 1875, and was an intermediate stop on (successively) the Ryde and Newport Railway, Isle of Wight Central Railway, Southern Railway and British Railways. The station was expanded in 1898 when a new siding was opened for goods, mineral and livestock traffic.

The original station closed on 21 September 1953, and the line itself closed in 1966. Part of the line was re-opened as the heritage Isle of Wight Steam Railway in 1971. A new station at Wootton, about two hundred yards to the south east of the original, was opened in August 1986, and is now recreated in the style of an Isle of Wight Central Railway-era station.

The Railway received a grant from the LEADER project in November 2011 for a rebuild of Wootton station, which involved extending the platform, extending the headshunt to accommodate the Ivatt tank locomotives, build a replica of the original wooden station building that was at Havenstreet, install new toilets and construct the base for the signal box, which will be relocated to the platform.

Over the Winter period 2019/2020 the Signal box lever frame (formally located in Shanklin Signal Box) was partially installed, and connected to the lineside infrastructure, as of September 2020, it controls 2 shunt signals, 1 set of points and a facing point lock, a further lever acts as a 'king' lever (which prevents the facing point lock from being withdrawn unless the single line token is present in the box)1 further lever is currently spare, both shunt signals are provided with electric repeaters due to poor sighting, and the Facing point lock retains its fowling bar, a treadle has been provided to assist pointsman in determining when a locomotive has moved clear of the points, the commissioning was completed immediately prior to the first operating days of the 2020 season (which had been delayed due to the COVID-19 travel restrictions).

Stationmasters
Robert James ca. 1878
Leonard Fenn ca. 1899
George Henry Edwards 1910 - ca. 1920 (afterwards station master at Whippingham)
Mr. Spinks ca. 1920 
Mr. Dibley ca. 1937

Gallery

References 

Heritage railway stations on the Isle of Wight
Former Isle of Wight Central Railway stations
Railway stations in Great Britain opened in 1875
Railway stations in Great Britain closed in 1953
Railway stations in Great Britain opened in 1986